Hedva Harekhavi, Israeli poet and artist, was born in 1941 in Kibbutz Degania Bet, one of the oldest kibbutzim in Israel. She had one child, Elisha, who died at a young age. She has lived most of her life in Jerusalem.

Harekhavi is a graduate of the Bezalel Academy of Art in Jerusalem. Her art works have been exhibited in one-person shows in Israel and in many group shows in Israel and abroad.

Her first poems published in the Hebrew daily Al Hamishmar (1967) were submitted for publication by the eminent Hebrew poet Leah Goldberg (1917–1970). Goldberg later selected and prepared for publication Harekhavi's first book of Hebrew poetry, Ki Hu Melech (Because He Is A King), 1974, which received the Rachel Newman Poetry Prize. Her poems have been translated into many languages including English, Arabic, Russian and German and have appeared in numerous publications and anthologies.

Her major collection of poetry, A Bird that is Inside Stands Outside: Poems, 1962-2008 was published in 2009 by the Kibbutz Ha Meuchad and the Bialik Institute in Jerusalem - two of Israel's major publishers of Hebrew poetry. Her most recent book, Rana, was published in 2014 by the Kibbutz Ha Meuchad Publisher.

She is known for writing poems that are heavy in repetition, which implies that the reader is not listening, further exacerbating her emotions. She is considered to be a part of the feminist movement of poetry, taking the linguistics of ancient Hebrew texts and using them as inspiration for her poetry.

She mainly paints in watercolor.

Harekhavi has won several prizes in poetry, among them the Prime Minister Prize for Poetry in 1982 and again in 1993; and the prestigious Yehuda Amichai Prize for Poetry in 2010. She is considered to be one of the great Israeli female poets.

Prizes 
The Rachel Newman Prize for Ki Hu Melech (Because He Is A King, 1974)
The Levi Eshkol Prime Minister's Prize for Hebrew Writers, 1982 and 1992. 
The Yehuda Amihai Prize, 2010. 
The Ramat Gan Prize, 2011.
The ACUM Prize for Poetry, 2013.
The Bialik Prize for Hebrew Literature, 2014.

Published Works 
 Because He Is A King- Poetry (1974) 
 Adi- Poetry (1981)
 I Just Want To Tell You- Poetry (1985)
 The Other-Poetry (1993)
 A Bird That is Inside Stands Outside- Poetry (2009)
 Rana-Poetry (2014)

References

External links
 Poetryinternationalweb.org 
 הבלוג של חדוה הרכבי באתר "בננות"
 שירשת: http://www.snunit.k12.il/shireshet/mainhed.html
 http://www.bac.org.il/ContentPage.aspx?id=1071

Living people
1941 births
20th-century Israeli women artists
21st-century Israeli women artists
Israeli women poets
Israeli poets
Israeli women painters
People from Degania Bet
Women watercolorists
Israeli watercolourists
Bezalel Academy of Arts and Design alumni
Israeli feminists